Glenn Johannesen (born February 15, 1962 in La Ronge, Saskatchewan and raised in North Battleford, Saskatchewan) is a retired professional ice hockey left winger. He was a 1980 10th-round (206th overall) NHL Draft pick of the New York Islanders as a defenceman, switched to left wing, and later played in two NHL games for them in 1985. He played in college at Western Michigan University, and continued to play minor league hockey until 1989. He was known to longtime Springfield Indians fans as "Moose".

Post-playing career
After his hockey career ended, Johannesen began working within proprietary education, first with ITT Technical Institutes and later art education (The Art Institutes International), and was elected the first president of The Art Institutes International Minnesota, The Art Institutes Canada and finally The Art Institute of Tampa in 2003 after having previously worked for Art Institutes International and The Art Institute of Fort Lauderdale.

Johannesen resigned his position with the Art Institute of Tampa in October 2009 to accept the position of President at Potomac College, a business and technology college, located in northwest Washington, D.C., in November 2009. Potomac College was placed on probation by The Middle States Commission on Higher Education while shortly after Johannesen joined Potomac College as a result of reports and practices within Potomac prior to Johannesen joining the organization. Johannesen left Potomac College, as did four board members, following disagreements with ownership over the business practices that had led to accreditation problems prior to Johannesen joining Potomac College and their unwillingness to substantively address those matters.

Johannesen joined Prism College in Cherry Hill, New Jersey, in the capacity of COO, and eventually President-COO while successfully taking the college out of show cause with ACCET and gaining renewed accreditation for the nursing programs at both the Cherry Hill and Philadelphia campuses, prior to leaving to entertain a consulting opportunity.

Johannesen later took up a role as President of Lincoln College of Technology in Columbia, Maryland.

Career statistics

Regular season and playoffs

References

External links

Glenn Johannesen Interview

1962 births
Living people
Billings Bighorns players
Canadian ice hockey left wingers
Canadian people of Norwegian descent
Ice hockey people from Saskatchewan
Indianapolis Checkers players
Indianapolis Ice players
Kalamazoo Wings (1974–2000) players
New York Islanders draft picks
New York Islanders players
Peoria Rivermen (IHL) players
Red Deer Rustlers players
Springfield Indians players
Sportspeople from North Battleford
Western Michigan Broncos men's ice hockey players